Coljava is a small settlement in the Municipality of Komen in the Littoral region of Slovenia.

References

External links

Coljava on Geopedia

Populated places in the Municipality of Komen